"Friends" is a song by American singer Amii Stewart, released as a single in 1984. The song contains backing vocals by Italian musician Mike Francis, who also wrote and composed the song. It did not initially appear on the 1984 album Try Love, except for the Dutch release, but was included on later pressings of the album. It was a hit in the UK, peaking at No. 12 on the UK Singles Chart. In the U.S., the song reached No. 46 on the Billboard Hot Black Singles chart in 1985.

References

1984 songs
1984 singles
Amii Stewart songs
Songs written by Mike Francis
RCA Records singles
Number-one singles in Italy
Italo disco songs